("Because We Got The Top!") is an album by NMB48. It topped the Oricon weekly albums chart in March 2013.

Details 
The album was released on February 27, 2013, in Japan and reached the top spot in sales of Oricon, selling 328,000 copies in the first week. It is available in several versions (Type "N", "M" or "B") with pockets and different content, and a special edition sold only at the theater where the group produces. It contains the first six singles' group previously released.

Track listing

Type-N

Type-M

Type-B

Theater Edition

Charts

Year-end charts

See also
List of number-one albums of 2013 (Japan)

References

Further reading

External links 
  

2013 debut albums
NMB48 albums